Arthur A. Macioszczyk (October 19, 1920 – May 16, 1982) was an American football fullback in the National Football League for the Philadelphia Eagles and Washington Redskins.  He played college football at Western Michigan University and was drafted in the 27th round of the 1943 NFL Draft by the Steagles. He served in World War II for the United States Army.

References

1920 births
1982 deaths
Players of American football from Michigan
American football fullbacks
Western Michigan Broncos football players
Philadelphia Eagles players
Washington Redskins players
People from Hamtramck, Michigan
United States Army personnel of World War II